Pettah is an urban neighbourhood of Thiruvananthapuram, the capital of the Indian state of Kerala.

Location
Pettah is on the way to Thiruvananthapuram International Airport and Shanghumugham Beach. Private and KSRTC buses connect Pettah to most parts of the city.

The railway station at Pettah is 3 km from Thiruvananthapuram Central railway station. 

Thiruvananthapuram International Airport International Terminal is around 2 km away.

Prominent institutions
 Railway Hospital
 Kerala Kaumudi Buildings
 Pettah Juma Masjid
 Tourist villages
 Hospitals - Lords, KIMS, Ananthapuri
 Temples - Puthen Kovil, Kanjiravilakom, Kaniyattiamman Kovil
 St. Anne's Church

Notable people
Palpu

References

External links

 About Pettah
 About Pettah Railway Station

Suburbs of Thiruvananthapuram